Trigonoscuta rossi was a species of beetle in family Curculionidae. It was endemic to the United States.

References

Entiminae
Taxonomy articles created by Polbot
Beetles described in 1975